Watkins Glen Grand Prix Course, 1948–1952 is a historic Grand Prix auto race track located at Watkins Glen in Schuyler County, New York. It includes the public rights of way that constituted the route of the original 6.6-mile (10.6 km) Watkins Glen Grand Prix course used from 1948 to 1952.  After a car left the road in the 1952 race, killing one spectator and injuring several others, the race was moved to a new location on a wooded hilltop southwest of town.

It was listed on the National Register of Historic Places in 2002.

See also

National Register of Historic Places listings in Schuyler County, New York

References

Buildings and structures in Schuyler County, New York
Sports venues on the National Register of Historic Places in New York (state)
Sports venues completed in 1948
Defunct motorsport venues in the United States
National Register of Historic Places in Schuyler County, New York
1948 establishments in New York (state)
1952 disestablishments in New York (state)